Ernest Hamilton Hutton (26 March 1867 – 12 July 1929) was an Australian cricketer. He played one first-class cricket match for Victoria in 1892 and one for Queensland in 1894.

See also
 List of Victoria first-class cricketers

References

External links
 

1867 births
1929 deaths
Australian cricketers
Victoria cricketers
Queensland cricketers